The Ascari KZ1 is a sports car made by Ascari Cars. The car is named from the initials of Ascari's owner Klaas Zwart, a wealthy Dutch businessman.

The KZ1 made its worldwide debut at the 2005 Autosport International with a price tag of £235,000. Each car required 340 hours of handcrafting at Ascari's 45,000 square-foot manufacturing facility in Banbury, England by a team of 30 highly skilled craftsmen. Owners also received the opportunity to drive the car at the Ascari-managed Race Resort Ascari in Spain. Production was limited to 50 units.

Specifications

Performance
The KZ1 is powered by a highly tuned BMW S62, a  V8 engine originally used in the E39 M5 and Z8.

Ascari KZ1-R

The Ascari KZ1-R is the racing version of the Ascari KZ1, primarily being featured in the new FIA GT3 European Championship and the United SportsCar Championship as well as other small level championships which run a similar formula.  The KZ1-R is similar to the road going KZ1, but vastly improved. The most obvious differences between the KZ1 and KZ1-R lie on the exterior of the car. Tuned for racing, the KZ1-R is still a pure road car in every right, but with the invigoration of a GT3 racer. The front lip spoiler has been updated with a pronounced splitter for increased down-force. Also unlike the KZ1, the race version features a large fixed racing wing, in place of the small adjustable spoiler found on the road car. The headlights have also been modified, with HID bulbs and turn signals, losing the silver, crystallized look of the KZ1. The rear fenders of the car have also been increased slightly to house the larger wheelbase. The wheels are forged aluminium alloy, to further reduce curb weight. The car features a stripped down interior with power windows removed, fine leather replaced by Alcantara, cloth, and carbon fibre racing seats and an integral roll cage, which adds rigidity to the car's body during races. Curb weight is reduced to an astounding , which is achieved by its carbon fibre chassis tub and a carbon fibre body shell. The KZ1-R retains power steering, a feature that is usually absent from race cars.

Engine

Chassis and brakes
The KZ1-R uses a carbon fibre chassis and a tubular steel rear frame. Both front and rear suspension are double-wishbone with coil over dampers, mated to anti-roll bars for stability. The wheels are 19-inch (483 mm) forged aluminium racing wheels mounted to 305/30x19 tires in the rear and 235/35x19 tires in the front. The front brakes are cross-drilled and vented with 6-piston racing-type calipers at the front and four-piston calipers at the rear.

Performance
The racing version manages to reach 62 mph (100 km/h) in about four-tenths of a second less than the standard KZ1, with numbers comparable to the Lamborghini Murcielago LP640.

Other media
The KZ1 was featured in November 2005 on the BBC television show Top Gear, where it set the 5th fastest lap time ever recorded on the show at 1 minute 20.7 seconds; currently, the KZ1 holds 26th place, the seventh-fastest time being 1:17.3 set by an Ascari A10.

References

External links

 Ascari KZ1-R data from www.supercars.net
 Ascari KZ1

KZ1
Sports cars
Rear mid-engine, rear-wheel-drive vehicles
2010s cars
Cars introduced in 2005